Francesco Alziator (1909, in Cagliari – 1977) was an Italian writer and journalist.  He was concerned for much of his career with the preservation of traditional Sardinian culture, mainly of is hometown Cagliari.

Biography 
Alziator was born into an aristocratic and monarchical family on March 12, 1909. His father Mario was consul of Holland. He graduated in literature in 1932 and, two years later, in political science. In 1928 he published his first article, Prefices and funeral songs, on The Sardinian Union; in the same year he began to collaborate with the Mediterranean magazine. For years a convinced fascist, was part of the cultural organization G.U.F. (Fascist University Youth).

Works 
  L'Elefante sulla torre. Itinerario cagliaritano, 1979-1982
  Attraverso i sentieri della memoria, 1979
  I giorni della laguna, 1977 (Studies about the Lagoon of Santa Gilla near Cagliari)
  Verso la storia dell'abbigliamento popolare in Sardegna, 1964
  La città del sole, 1963 (about is hometown Cagliari)
  Picaro e folklore e altri saggi di storia delle tradizioni popolari, 1959
  Il Folclore Sardo, Cagliari, 1957.
  Storiografia della tradizioni popolari di Sardegna, 1957
  Storia della letteratura di Sardegna, 1954

External links 
F. Alziator's voice in Sardegna Digital Library

1909 births
1977 deaths
People from Cagliari
20th-century Italian writers
20th-century Italian male writers
Italian male journalists
20th-century Italian journalists